James Kelham (1796 – 1 April 1882) was a New Zealand businessman and politician.

Biography

He arrived in Wellington in the ship London in 1842, and was the New Zealand Company's accountant in Wellington. He was prominent in Wellington's early business community, and was elected as first chairman of the Wellington Chamber of Commerce in 1856.

He represented the City of Wellington in the 1st New Zealand Parliament, but resigned on 3 August 1855.  He also served on the Wellington Provincial Council, representing the City of Wellington electorate in 1856. He was made a Justice of the Peace in 1870. He owned land in Lower Hutt where he had a cottage built in the 1870s or 1880s; the building is these days the gatehouse of Vogel House.

He is buried in St James (Anglican) Churchyard, Lower Hutt. Ward's Early Wellington erroneously says he died in 1862.

References

Evening Post, 3 April 1882 (Death notice)
Timaru Herald, 5 April 1882 (Notes, page 2)

External links
New Zealand Electronic Text Centre

1796 births
1882 deaths
Members of the New Zealand House of Representatives
Members of the Wellington Provincial Council
New Zealand accountants
New Zealand MPs for Wellington electorates
19th-century New Zealand businesspeople
19th-century New Zealand politicians